Sredny Utyash (Urta Ütäş) is a rural locality (a village) in Zilim-Karanovsky Selsoviet, Gafuriysky District, Bashkortostan, Russia. The population was 56 as of 2010. There are 2 streets.

Geography 
Sredny Utyash is located 47 km north of Krasnousolsky (the district's administrative centre) by road. Maly Utyash is the nearest rural locality.

References 

Rural localities in Gafuriysky District